Cellana talcosa, the talc limpet or turtle limpet is a species of true limpet, a marine gastropod mollusc in the family Nacellidae, which is one of the true limpet families. 

It is one of the many edible mollusks.

This species is endemic to the Hawaiian islands, where its common name is koele or opihi ko'ele.  It is the largest limpet found in the Hawaiian islands and can reach 4 inches in diameter.

References

 Severns, M. (2011). Shells of the Hawaiian Islands - The Sea Shells. Conchbooks, Hackenheim. 564 pp. page(s): 36

External links
 Hawaii.edu —Cellana talcosa

Nacellidae
Endemic fauna of Hawaii
Molluscs of the Pacific Ocean
Gastropods described in 1846